Balfour is a Scottish surname born by members of the Clan Balfour.

Balfour commonly refers to Arthur Balfour (1848–1930), Prime Minister of the United Kingdom from 1902 to 1905, 1st Earl of Balfour and later Foreign Secretary.

Balfour may also refer to:

Earls of Balfour

 Gerald Balfour, 2nd Earl of Balfour (1853–1945), Arthur's brother and also a Conservative politician

Barons Kinross
 John Balfour, 1st Baron Kinross (1837–1905), British politician
 Patrick Balfour, 3rd Baron Kinross (1904–1976), British historian

Balfours of Balbirnie
 Robert Balfour, 4th of Balbirnie (1698–1767)
 Robert Balfour, 6th of Balbirnie (1762–1837), cavalry officer

Balfours of Whittingehame

 James Balfour (died 1845) (c 1775–1845), Scottish nabob, landowner and Tory politician
 James Maitland Balfour (1820–1856), Scottish politician
 Eustace Balfour (1854–1911), Scottish architect and aide-de-camp to King Edward VII
 Francis Maitland Balfour (1851–1882), biologist
 Elizabeth Balfour, Countess of Balfour (1867-1942), British suffragette and politician
 Lady Eve Balfour (1899–1990), English pioneer of organic farming

Others
 Alexander Balfour (disambiguation) 
 Andrew Balfour (1873–1931), Scottish medical officer, author and international rugby player
 Constance Balfour (1880-1965), American singer
 David Balfour (disambiguation)
 David A. Balfour (1889–1956), Canadian politician
 David Paton Balfour (1841–1894), New Zealand sheepfarmer, station manager, roading supervisor and diarist
 Donald Balfour (1882–1963), Canadian surgeon
 Edward Balfour (1808–1884), Scottish surgeon and orientalist in India
 Eric Balfour (born 1977), American actor
 Evan Balfour (born 1965), Scottish footballer
Fiona Balfour, Australian business executive in the field of information technology
 Frederic H. Balfour (fl. 1871–1908), British essayist and translator
 George William Balfour (1823-1903), Scottish physician 
 Grant Balfour (born 1977), baseball player
 Harriët Balfour (1818—1858), Surinamese freed slave
 Harold Balfour, 1st Baron Balfour of Inchrye (1897–1988), British World War I fighter ace and Conservative politician
 H. Balfour Gardiner (1877–1950), British composer
 Honor Balfour (1912–2001), British politician and journalist
 Sir Isaac Bayley Balfour (1853–1922), Scottish botanist
 James Balfour (architect) (1854–1917), Canadian architect from Hamilton, Ontario
 James Balfour (Canadian politician) (1928–1999)
 James Balfour (clergyman) (1731–1809), Newfoundland Church of England clergyman
 James Balfour (engineer) (1831-1869), New Zealand marine engineer
 James Balfour (philosopher) (1705-1795), Scottish advocate and philosopher
 James Balfour (planter) (1777–1841), Scottish-born Surinamese planter
 James Balfour, Lord Pittendreich (1583–1584), Scottish judge and politician
 Sir James Balfour of Denmilne and Kinnaird, 1st Baronet (1600–1658), Scottish annalist and antiquary, Lord Lyon King of Arms from 1650–1654
 Sir James Balfour Paul (1846–1931), Scottish heraldist, Lord Lyon King of Arms from 1890–1926
 John Hutton Balfour (1808–1884), Scottish botanist
 Mabel Balfour, South African trade unionist and anti-apartheid activist
 Andrew Balfour of Montquhanie, Scottish landowner
 Nancy Balfour (1911–1997), English arts administrator and journalist
 Sebastian Balfour (born 1941), English historian
 William Balfour (died 1660), English Civil War general

See also
 Earl of Balfour
 Balfour baronets
 Lord Balfour of Burleigh
 Baron Balfour of Glenawley
 Baron Kinross
 William Balfour Baikie

English-language surnames
Scottish surnames
Surnames of Lowland Scottish origin
Clan Balfour